Momenabad Rural District is a rural district (dehestan) in the Central District of Sarbisheh County, South Khorasan Province, Iran. At the 2006 census, its population was 9,997, in 2,592 families.  The rural district has 98 villages.

References 

Rural Districts of South Khorasan Province
Sarbisheh County